Inge Ludvigsen (born 10 March 1965), is a retired Norwegian footballer from Bergen that played most of his career in Fyllingen Fotball. He also played for IK Start and SK Brann.

After he retired as a footballer he has been manager in Fyllingen Fotball but resigned in 2005. Inge Ludvigsen is brother of footballer Per-Ove Ludvigsen.

References

1965 births
Living people
Norwegian footballers
Fyllingen Fotball players
SK Brann players
IK Start players
Eliteserien players
Norwegian First Division players
Norwegian football managers
Association football defenders
Footballers from Bergen